Robert Martin (December 1, 1900 – November 26, 1942) was an American bobsledder who competed in the 1930s. He finished fourth in the four-man event at the 1936 Winter Olympics in Garmisch-Partenkirchen.

References
1936 bobsleigh four-man results
1936 Olympic Winter Games official report. - p. 414.
Robert Martin's profile at Sports Reference.com

1900 births
1942 deaths
American male bobsledders
Bobsledders at the 1936 Winter Olympics
Olympic bobsledders of the United States